The Journal of Higher Education is a bimonthly peer-reviewed academic journal covering higher education. The journal was established in 1930. It is published by Taylor & Francis. Previously, it was published by Ohio State University Press. The editor-in-chief is Stephen J. Quaye (The Ohio State University).

Abstracting and indexing 
The journal is abstracted and indexed in:

According to the Journal Citation Reports, the journal has a 2020 impact factor of 3.108. The journal has a five-year impact factor of 3.769 and is ranked 72/264 of journals in the Education & Educational Research Category. The 2019 CiteScore is 4.1, which ranks in the top 10% of over 1300 journals in the Education category.

References

External links 
 

Publications established in 1930
Education journals
English-language journals
Ohio State University
Academic journals published by university presses
Bimonthly journals